Synthetic Soul is the debut extended play by Canadian experimental soul band Chiiild. It was released on February 28, 2020, by Avant Garden and Island Records. The EP exemplifies the band's blend of soul, r&b, psychedelia, jazz, indie, and pop. It also features a sole guest appearance from Zimbabwean American singer and songwriter Shungudzo.

Release and promotion 
Synthetic Soul was officially released for digital download and streaming on February 28, 2020, by Avant Garden and Island Records. A short documentary film of the same name—shot by Peter Hou at Wild Studio, in Saint-Zénon, Quebec—was released on May 14, 2020. The film exhibits the remote haven in which the EP was created and introduces the band's empirical approach to songwriting.

Singles 
"Count Me Out" was released on July 31, 2019, as the EP's lead single. It received world premiere support from Rory Farrell on The Joe Budden Podcast. The EP's second single, "Back to Life", featured Shungudzo and premiered on Zane Lowe's Beats 1 radio show on September 13, 2019. "Darling" was released as the third single on November 13, 2019. The fourth single, "Hands Off Me", was released on January 22, 2020.

On July 22, 2020, a stripped version of "Pirouette" was released as a promotional single. It was synced on ABC's Grey's Anatomy, airing on the seventeenth season's fifth episode, "Fight the Power," on December 10, 2020.

Critical reception 
Upon its release, Synthetic Souls sound was widely acclaimed by music critics. In speaking about the band's artistry, Krista Apardian of Ones to Watch proclaimed that the EP's "delicate balance of smooth retro soul, psychedelia, and modern R&B" produced "an entrancing mix of old and new." Writing for Lyrical Lemonade, Lucas Garrison commended the EP's introspective lyrics, claiming that "[Chiiild] really succeed in blending experimentation with emotion." 
While commenting on the saturation of experimental R&B in indie music, Dominiq Robinson of HotNewHipHop positively distinguished ''Synthetic Souls textural production—calling it a sonic "blueprint" in the use of "ambient synth pads, funky basslines, lo-fi drum sequencing, and reverb-heavy vocals".

In addition to Synthetic Soul's positive reception, Chiiild has been listed as an "Artist to Watch" by media outlets such as Pigeons & Planes, The Line of Best Fit, Paste Magazine, Exclaim!, and Spotify's global emerging-artist program, RADAR.

 Accolades 
"Hands Off Me" was shortlisted for Triple J's Hottest 100 on December 8, 2020. On December 15th, Chiiild received their first Song of the Year nomination, for "Pirouette", at WTB'''s inaugural We The Beat Awards. They were announced as the winners of the award on December 28, 2020.

Track listing 
EP credits adapted from Tidal.

Personnel 
Personnel credits adapted from AllMusic.

 Yonatan "xSDTRK" Ayal – vocals, production, recording engineer, bass, keyboards
 Pierre-Luc Rioux – production, recording engineer, guitar

 Alexandra Shungudzo Govere – featured artist
 Isabelle "Izzi" Dunn – strings
 Lauren "LYON" Malyon – strings

 Maxime Bellavance – drums
 John "J-Banga" Kercy – mixing
 Chris Gehringer – mastering

Release history

References

External links 
 

2020 debut EPs
Island Records EPs
Soul jazz EPs
Psychedelic music EPs
Soul albums by Canadian artists
Experimental music EPs
Experimental music albums by Canadian artists